Edward Francis Baxter Orton Sr. (March 9, 1829 – October 16, 1899) was a United States geologist, and the first president of The Ohio State University.

Biography
Orton came from New York State, born in the town of Deposit in Delaware County and raised in the Lake Erie town of Ripley. He entered Hamilton College in 1845, graduating in 1848.  He then spent time at Lane Theological Seminary (1849–50), Lawrence Scientific School at Harvard (1852–53), and then Andover Theological Seminary. During those times he taught to get income, but was interested in entering the ministry. He was ordained in 1856. 

From 1856 to 1859, he was professor of natural science in the New York state normal school at Albany. From 1859 to 1865, he was principal of the preparatory academy of Chester, New York. He became professor of natural history at Antioch College in 1865, and became its president in 1872. A year later, Orton became president of what was then the Ohio Agricultural and Mechanical College (now Ohio State University), where he also became professor of geology. He resigned the presidency in 1881, but continued as professor of geology until his death.

Orton was assistant state geologist of Ohio from 1869 to 1875.  He was named state geologist in 1882, and continued in that position until his death in Columbus, Ohio on October 16, 1899. He was a member of scientific societies, and was president of the state sanitary association of Ohio in 1884–85. He suffered a partially paralyzing stroke in 1891, but continued to work.

Orton served for a time on the geological surveys of the United States, of Kentucky, and of Kansas, and was president of the Geological Society of America (1896), and of the American Association for the Advancement of Science (1898–99). He was essentially an economic geologist, and specialized in the study of oil and gas, developing several well-known theories, notably the “anticlinal theory”, and becoming widely known as an authority on the nature and geological occurrence of these products.

Through his marriage to Anna Davenport Torrey, Orton was an uncle of U.S. President and Supreme Court Chief Justice William Howard Taft and a brother-in-law to Taft's father, U.S. Attorney General and Secretary of War Alphonso Taft.

Legacy

OSU constructed a geology building in 1893, and named it Orton Hall, in tribute to Orton's seminal contributions to the university.  In 1920, his son Edward Orton Jr., the first Chairman of Ceramic Engineering at The Ohio State University, honored his father with the Orton Memorial Library of Geology, inside Orton Hall, for perusing the theories and records of earthly change.

An Orton monument is located just outside of Clifton, Ohio within the Clifton Gorge State Nature Preserve and the John Bryan State Park.  It is on the Orton trail running through these parks.

Works
 Geology of Ohio, in part (Columbus, 1872-1875)
 Economic Geology of Ohio (2 vols., 1883-1888)
 Petroleum and Inflammable Gas (1887)
  With OSU professor of history John Thomas Short.
He was also the author of various addresses, scientific papers, and contributions.

Notes

References

External links

19th-century American geologists
Hamilton College (New York) alumni
Harvard School of Engineering and Applied Sciences alumni
Antioch College
Antioch College faculty
Ohio State University alumni
Ohio State University faculty
Presidents of Ohio State University
1829 births
1899 deaths
Economic geologists
People from Delaware County, New York
People from Chester, Orange County, New York
Presidents of Antioch College
Scientists from New York (state)
Presidents of the Geological Society of America